Pivovarovo is a rural locality (a village) in Oktyabrskoye Rural Settlement, Vyaznikovsky District, Vladimir Oblast, Russia. The population was 139 as of 2010. There are 2 streets.

Geography 
Pivovarovo is located 19 km southwest of Vyazniki (the district's administrative centre) by road. Serkovo is the nearest rural locality.

References 

Rural localities in Vyaznikovsky District